James Kenji López-Alt (born October 31, 1979) is an American chef and food writer. His first book, The Food Lab: Better Home Cooking Through Science, became a critical and commercial success, charting on the New York Times Bestseller list and winning the 2016 James Beard Foundation Award for the best General Cooking cookbook. The cookbook expanded on López-Alt's "The Food Lab" column on the Serious Eats blog. López-Alt is known for using the scientific method in his cooking to improve popular American recipes and to explain the science of cooking. 

López-Alt co-founded Wursthall in 2017, a beer hall style restaurant in San Mateo, California.  He now maintains a popular YouTube channel in which he demonstrates various recipes and cooking techniques with a POV filming style. He released a children's book titled Every Night is Pizza Night in 2020 and a cookbook titled The Wok: Recipes and Techniques in 2022 which focused on the eponymous cooking vessel, both of which became New York Times Bestsellers.

Early life and education
Born James Kenji Alt, López-Alt is the son of Harvard University geneticist and immunologist Frederick Alt, who is of German descent, and the grandson of Japanese chemist Koji Nakanishi, his maternal grandfather. López-Alt attended the Dalton School and graduated from Massachusetts Institute of Technology (MIT) in 2002, where he majored in architecture.

Career

Early career (2000s to 2015)

López-Alt's first restaurant job was during his sophomore year of college. He attempted to take a job as a waiter at a local restaurant, but they needed a prep cook. He later worked with several Boston chefs including Barbara Lynch and Ken Oringer. He went on to work as a test cook and editor at Cook's Illustrated magazine and America's Test Kitchen.

López-Alt was the Managing Culinary Director and is the Chief Culinary Consultant of Serious Eats, a food blog, where he authored the James Beard Award-nominated column "The Food Lab". He later adapted this column into his first book, The Food Lab: Better Home Cooking Through Science, which was published in September 2015 by W. W. Norton & Company. It was a New York Times Bestseller and won the 2016 James Beard Foundation Award for General Cooking, as well as the International Association of Culinary Professionals awards for Best American Cookbook and Cookbook of the Year. Penny Pleasance of the New York Journal of Books called The Food Lab "a seminal work that is encyclopedic in scope and can be used as a reference by even the most experienced home cooks".

After The Food Lab (2016 to present)

López-Alt opened the Wursthall Restaurant & Bierhaus in San Mateo, California in 2017, with partners Adam Simpson and Tyson Mao. 

López-Alt started a YouTube channel in 2016, which, as of March 2022, has over one million subscribers and over 100 million views. The videos are POV-style demonstrations of recipes and cooking techniques in López-Alt's home kitchen that feature unscripted commentary and largely unedited footage.

In September 2019, López-Alt became a monthly columnist at The New York Times Cooking.

In 2020 López-Alt released a children's book, Every Night is Pizza Night, which debuted on the New York Times Children's Bestseller list.

After his move to Seattle in late 2020, López-Alt's Instagram posts became increasingly popular as he recommended various businesses and dishes around the area, becoming "maybe the most powerful food influencer this city has seen in the social media age," according to The Seattle Times.

In 2022, López-Alt released a cookbook titled The Wok: Recipes and Techniques, a 658-page book focused on woks. The Seattle Times called the book "arguably the most anticipated cookbook of the year" and it debuted at number one on the New York Times Bestseller list in the category of "Advice, How-To & Miscellaneous". It won the 2023 Pacific Northwest Book Award.

Personal life
As of 2021, López-Alt resides in Seattle, Washington, after previously living in San Mateo, California, New York City, and Boston.

Upon marriage, López-Alt combined his birth surname, Alt, with that of his wife Adriana López. López-Alt has two children, the second of which was born in September 2021.

In January 2019, López-Alt tweeted that "if you come to my restaurant wearing a MAGA cap, you aren't getting served, same as if you come in wearing a swastika, white hood, or any other symbol of intolerance and hate" and "If you’re comfortable sitting next to a MAGA wearer I’m probably not interested in serving you either." He later apologized and deleted the tweet.

Filmography

Publications

References

External links
 

1979 births
Living people
21st-century American male writers
American bloggers
American food writers
American male chefs
Asian American chefs
American restaurateurs
American writers of Japanese descent
Businesspeople from the San Francisco Bay Area
Cuisine of the San Francisco Bay Area
Dalton School alumni
Food and cooking YouTubers
James Beard Foundation Award winners
MIT School of Architecture and Planning alumni
American male bloggers
21st-century American businesspeople
21st-century American non-fiction writers
American cookbook writers
American YouTubers
Chefs from Massachusetts
Businesspeople from Massachusetts
Writers from Seattle